Xenia Tchoumitcheva, known professionally as Xenia Tchoumi (Ксения Чумичева, born 5 August 1987 in Magnitogorsk, Russia), is a Russian-Swiss model, actress and blogger.

Early years
Tchoumitcheva was born in Magnitogorsk, Russia. When she was 6 years old her family emigrated to Lugano, Switzerland. Tchoumitcheva lived in the Italian part of Switzerland before moving to London, UK.

She graduated in 2010 from the Università della Svizzera italiana with a Bachelor Degree in economics. She speaks Italian, Russian, German, French, English and Spanish.

Tchoumitcheva has interned at several financial institutions such as Merrill Lynch, The London Hedge Fund Duet Group and JP Morgan Chase.

Career

Model and fashion influencer

Tchoumitcheva began modelling at the age of 12, and became famous in her hometown. When she entered the national "Miss Switzerland" pageant in 2006, she was judged as both 1st runner-up and Miss Photogenic. It stirred up a national controversy. For the first time in history, the Miss Switzerland organization took the unprecedented step of offering Tchoumitcheva an appearance contract similar to that of the winner. After the contest she was considered the "most eligible single woman in Switzerland". In May 2009 she was elected as the Best Bikini Body, according to a survey by the magazine Schweizer Illustrierte. In 2012 she was featured with a photoshoot and personal interview in the Spanish GQ magazine.

In December 2012, the Swiss edition of Maxim magazine put her on the cover and granted her the title of "Most Beautiful Woman of the Year".

Tchoumitcheva has worked with several modelling agencies including Option Model Agency (Zürich), Oxygen Models, Tess Management, and Elite Model Management (Barcelona and Miami).

She was elected as one of the 99 most influential women in the world for 2016, according to the AskMen annual list for the category influencers.
As a digital influencer, she collaborates with names of the likes of Ferragamo, Dior and Vogue. In fall 2016 she shot fashion editorials with magazines of the likes of ELLE, Vanity Fair and L'Officiel.

In September 2019, Tchoumi—who has worked with brands such as Chopard, L'Oréal, Moët & Chandon, Bulgari, American Express, Tom Ford and Samsung—signed a representation deal with the talent agency CAA in areas including television, endorsements, personal appearances and publishing.

Public speaker 
Tchoumitcheva gives regular public speeches at universities and conferences about her online business, brand creation and, most often, female leadership. Amongst her speeches, she spoke at the Swiss Web Program Festival, at the Cantonal Bank of Geneva and at the University of St.Gallen Alumni Conference - where she also interviewed the ex-Deutsche Bank CEO Josef Ackermann. In September 2015 she gave a TEDx talk about female leadership and internet against prejudice.

In 2017, she gave a talk at the United Nations HQ about the power of digital women, and was officially nominated an ITC SheTrades ambassador.

Published author 
In December 2020, Tchoumitcheva published a book "Empower Yourself". The book discussed motivation, independent thinking and gender equality.

Actress 
Tchoumitcheva began to work in commercials and music videos in 2007 (e.g. "Candino-Festina"). She starred in the short movie Les Enfants de la Honte of the French film maker Alain Margot, which appeared on the NIFF film festival. She was in the music video with Italian-Swiss singer Paolo Meneguzzi in May 2010. In June 2011 she was supporting role in the short film Lines.

After graduating from the university in 2010, she travelled to New York City and took acting classes at the New York Film Academy.

In January 2011, Tchoumitcheva finished shooting a role as a rockstar in the French cinema production Bob et Les Sex Pistaches starring the French actor Jules Sitruk. She also appeared in the film Without Men with Eva Longoria and Christian Slater in 2011.

TV host 
Among several hosting engagements, she presented the Miss Switzerland 2011 pageant live on the three national channels on 24 September 2011.

In March 2012 Tchoumicheva started to host her own TV show about successful Italian businesses called "L'Italia che funziona", on Italian channels Rete 4 and Italia1. She also hosted Miss Ukraine 2012 in Russian, alongside the Russian comedians "Prozhektorperiskhilton" (ПрожекторПерисхилтон).

In April 2013, Tchoumitcheva was the official host and catwalk model of the annual Energy Fashion Night with Irina Shayk.

Since 2013, Tchoumitcheva works as a journalist for the Swiss economic magazine Bilan and has her own online show called La Recette de Mon Succès.

Spokesmodel 
Tchoumitcheva has modelled for different brands including Visilab Sunglasses, Audi, Burger King and Casino Lugano. In 2012, she was the official face of the Spanish airline Air Europa, Revlon cosmetics and Nikon cameras. In 2015, Xenia becomes the official brand ambassadress for Swiss Smile luxury products.
She also collaborated for her blog as the official fashion influencer with the Pirelli Calendar 2015, together with Scott Schumman from the blog The Sartorialist In 2016, Xenia's yearly partnership with the luxury watch brand IWC was announced.

Writer 
As of 2012, Tchoumitcheva co-writes a monthly column for the cultural magazine Schweizer Monat and the luxury US magazine Haute Living. She also launched her own online business and luxury blog called "Chic Overdose" in the spring of 2013.

Professional name
As of 2015, Xenia has changed her official public name to the shortened version Xenia Tchoumi, as it's internationally easier to pronounce.

Date of birth
Tchoumitcheva's date of birth has widely been reported as 5 August 1987. In late 2010, her website began reporting her date of birth as 5 August 1989, making her two years younger.  The 1989 year of birth continues to be widely reported. Reporters for Schweizer Fernsehen, the Swiss public broadcasting organisation, interviewed representatives of the Miss Switzerland pageant, who noted that she had provided proper identification. They also reported that had she been born in 1989, she would have been ineligible for the competition. On 6 December 2010, the network reported a statement from Tchoumitcheva confirming the 1987 date of birth.

References

External links

 Xenia Tchoumitcheva about her background, self-management and what beauty means to her – interviewed by Xecutives.net Christian Düblin, October 2011

1987 births
Living people
Swiss female models
Russian female models
Russian emigrants to Switzerland
Russian expatriates in Switzerland
University of Lugano alumni